Baby Rani was an Indian child artist, who was active in Tamil Cinema during the latter 20th century. She acted in more than 90 films in Tamil, Telugu, Malayalam, Kannada and Hindi.

Filmography

Accolades

References

External links

Indian child actresses
Best Child Artist National Film Award winners
Living people
Year of birth missing (living people)